Maud Yates was a British actress of the silent era.

Selected filmography
 Tommy Atkins (1915)
 The Rogues of London (1915)
 Jane Shore (1915)
 Trapped by the London Sharks (1916)
 What Every Woman Knows (1917)
 Thelma (1918)
 The Secret Woman (1918)
 The Romance of Lady Hamilton (1919)
 God's Clay (1919)
 The Green Terror (1919)
 Castles in Spain (1920)
Branded (1920)
 A Bachelor's Baby (1922)
 The Peacemaker (1922)

References

External links

Year of birth unknown
Year of death unknown
British silent film actresses
20th-century British actresses